Krasnokamensk may refer to:
Krasnokamensk (urban locality), several urban localities in Russia
Krasnokamensk Urban Settlement, several municipal urban settlements in Russia
Krasnokamensk Airport, an airport in Zabaykalsky Krai, Russia